Bepanaah is a 1985 Indian Hindi-language film directed by Jagdish Sidana, starring Shashi Kapoor, Mithun Chakraborty, Poonam Dhillon, Rati Agnihotri, Suresh Oberoi, Madan Puri, Kader Khan in pivotal roles.

Summary

Bajrang, a naive youngster from a small village finds himself exploited when he reaches Bombay, but he is happy as he meets Bhavna Bhardwaj and falls in love with her. But Bhavna loves Ravi Malhotra, a CBI Officer. Bhavna and Ravi get intimate, but circumstances separates them. Now Bhavna is pregnant and delivers Ravi's son and names him Rohit. As Bhavna is unable to reveal the name of Ravi, Bajrang rescues her to by giving her his family name. But what would happen to Bhavna, when she knows that Bajrang is now a gangster? Moreover, Ravi is now married to Radha. Does Ravi know the truth? What would happen to Bhavna and would Ravi nab Bajrang forms the climax.

Cast
 Shashi Kapoor as CID Inspector Ravi Malhotra
 Mithun Chakraborty as Bajrang aka Babua
 Poonam Dhillon as Radha Malhotra
 Rati Agnihotri as Advocate Bhavna Bharadwaj
 Suresh Oberoi as Akbar Lala (Truck Driver)
 Madan Puri (Voiced by Amrish Puri) as Advocate Devilal
 Kader Khan as Dayashankar "Daddu"
 Dheeraj Kumar as Sheshnag
 Sharat Saxena as Ujagar Singh
 Satyen Kappu as Advocate Pratap Narayan Singh
 Paintal as Dasbihari Brahmachari
 Gajanan Jagirdar as Brahmprakash Bharadwaj
 Brahmachari as Jailor Yusuf Khan
 Mazhar Khan as Jack
 Gurbachan Singh as Babu
 Jankidas as Judge
 Guddi Maruti as Customer in the restaurant
 C.S. Dubey as the man who misleads Bhavna in the court

Soundtrack

References

External links
 

1985 films
1980s Hindi-language films
Indian action films
Films scored by Khayyam
1985 action films
Hindi-language action films